Ledvance GmbH with headquarters in Garching bei München, Germany is an international company for lighting products and networked light applications that evolved from the divestment of Osram Licht AG in July 2016. According to its own information the company employs around 9,000 people in 120 countries. Since April 2018, Ledvance is owned by Chinese lighting company MLS.

History 

In April 2015, it was announced that Osram would divest its lamp business for general lighting with just over one third of its employees. In June 2015 the supervisory board of Osram Licht AG agreed to the divestment of their lamp division with products such as LED lamps, halogen lamps and compact fluorescent lamps. Since 1 July 2016, Ledvance has operated as a legally independent company. The company is permitted continued use of the brand names Osram and Sylvania in the United States and Canada. At the end of July 2016, Osram announced that Ledvance would be sold for more than €400 million to a Chinese consortium. The new owners, each with one-third stake, were expected to be the Chinese light source manufacturer MLS and the Chinese finance investors Yiwu and IDG. The sale was being assessed by the regulatory authorities. The conclusion of the transaction was expected during the fiscal year 2017 pending regulatory approval. The sale of Ledvance by Osram to the Chinese investment consortium, consisting of investor IDG Capital; LED packaging manufacturer MLS; and Yiwu, was successfully completed on March 3, 2017 with economic effect as of March 1, 2017. Since April 2018, MLS is the sole owner of Ledvance.

Products 
Following divestment, the product portfolio of Ledvance consists of LED lamps, over-the-counter (OTC) luminaires, lighting solutions for the Smart Home and Smart Building sectors and traditional lamps. The products are distributed via wholesale and retail as well as online platforms.

Locations 
The company is active in more than 120 countries worldwide.

References

Lighting brands
German brands
Garching bei München
Companies based in Upper Bavaria
Manufacturing companies established in 2016
German companies established in 2016